Brennan Lee Mulligan (born January 4, 1988) is an American comedian, actor, writer, and gamemaster.  He has worked with CollegeHumor as a sketch writer and performer, and as gamemaster for their Dungeons & Dragons web series, Dimension 20, as well as writing the superhero webcomic Strong Female Protagonist alongside artist Molly Ostertag.

Early life
Mulligan was born on January 4, 1988, in New York as the son of Elaine Lee and Joe Mulligan. He was introduced to the role-playing game Dungeons & Dragons by his mother at age nine, first gamemastering at age ten.  In 2005, at 17 years old, Mulligan graduated from SUNY Ulster with an associate degree, having majored in philosophy/humanities.

Career

Writing
For many years in his teens, Mulligan was a lead story writer and performer for the live action role-playing summer camp, The Wayfinder Experience. Mulligan and Molly Ostertag co-created the webcomic Strong Female Protagonist, which was named one of io9's Best New and Short Webcomics of 2012.

Mulligan has also been a writer on web series such as Um, Actually and Troopers for Dropout.

Performing
In his twenties, he performed and taught comedy at the Upright Citizens Brigade (UCB).  It was working at the UCB that led Mulligan to working at CollegeHumor, (premiering on December 14, 2017, with Who's the Real Cop?).

Since 2018, Mulligan has been an executive producer, writer, and gamemaster for Dimension 20 on the streaming platform Dropout (which also hosts his video podcast, Adventuring Academy).  In his capacity as a professional D&D gamemaster, he has been cited by Bleeding Cool, Comic Book Resources, Wired, and Wizards of the Coast's own Dungeons & Dragons podcast—Dragon Talk. Glen Weldon, in a review of Dimension 20 for NPR, commented that "Mulligan is such a good DM and he's got so many improv skills. He's such a close and responsive listener that no matter what the players throw at him, he can always roll with it, without breaking the game. And that is a very rare skill, so it's terrific stuff". Mulligan was the Dungeon Master for Exandria Unlimited: Calamity, a weekly, four-part actual play web series spin-off of Critical Role that premiered on May 26, 2022. In January 2023, it was announced that Mulligan with Erika Ishii, Aabria Iyengar, and Lou Wilson will star in the creator-owned actual play podcast Worlds Beyond Number; the show is scheduled to premiere in March 2023.

Awards
He has received an "Excellence in Performance Award" from the New York International Fringe Festival, and won a 2019 Webby Award in the "Comedy: Shortform" category for his CollegeHumor skit, Tide CEO: You Gotta Stop Eating Tide Pods.

Personal life 
In November 2015, Mulligan was a contestant on the American version of Who Wants to Be a Millionaire and won  after incorrectly answering the -question.  
By 2020, he lived in Los Angeles.  On January 21, 2021, Mulligan announced his engagement to his fiancée—Isabella "Izzy" Roland—via Instagram.

Filmography

Television

Web

References

External links

1988 births
Living people
American people of Irish descent
American webcomic creators
CollegeHumor people
Male actors from New York City
SUNY Ulster alumni
Webby Award winners
Writers from New York City